Eastern Orthodox church buildings in Australia include:

Greek Orthodox Church (Ecumenical Patriarchate of Constantinople) 

Greek Orthodox Archdiocese of Australia is served by the Archbishop Makarios who was elected on May 9th, 2019 by the Holy and Sacred Synod of the Ecumenical Patriarchate.

Greek Orthodox churches in Australia include:

Australian Capital Territory
 St Nicholas - Kingston

New South Wales

 Cathedral of the Annunciation of Our Lady - Redfern
 The Archangels - Albury
 St Savvas of Kalymnos - Banksia
 St Euphemia - Bankstown
 St John the Forerunner & Baptist - Batemans Bay
 All Saints - Belmore
 St Paraskevi & St Barbara - Blacktown
 St Nectarios - Burwood
 St Dionysios - Central Mangrove
 St Michael - Crows Nest
 The Dormition of Our Lady - Darlington
 The Lady of the Myrtles - Dubbo
 The Transfiguration of our Lord - Earlwood
 St Andrew - Gladesville
 St Panteleimon - Goulburn
 St Stylianos, Sts Peter & Paul & St Gregory of Palama - Gymea
 The Holy Apostles - Hamilton
 St Stephanos - Hurlstone Park
 St Basil the Great & St George - Islington (Ukrainian-speaking)
 St Spyridon - Kingsford
 The Resurrection of our Lord, Our Lady of the Myrtles, St. Elessa - Kogarah
 St Gerasimos - Leichhardt
 St Raphael, Nicholas & Irene - Liverpool
 St Nicholas - Marrickville
 St Catherine - Mascot
 Sts Constantine & Helen - Newtown
 St John the Forerunner & Baptist - Old Erowal Bay
 St Catherine - Orange
 St Sophia - Paddington
 St John the Forerunner - Parramatta
 St Dimitrios - Queanbeyan
 St Athanasios - Rookwood
 St George - Rose Bay
 St Demetrios - St Marys
 The Holy Trinity - Surry Hills
 St Sophia & Three Daughters - Surry Hills
 St Demetrios - Tamworth
 St Therapon - Thornleigh
 St Haralambos - Tuggerah
 The Dormition of Our Lady - Wagga Wagga
 Holy Cross - Wollongong
 St Nektarios - Wollongong
 Holy Monastery of Panagia Pantanassa - Mangrove Creek
 Holy Monastery of the Holy Cross - Mangrove Mountain
 Holy Monastery of St George - Yellow Rock

Victoria
 St Eustathios - South Melbourne
 The Dormition of Our Lady - Altona North
 Our Lady The Merciful - Bacchus Marsh
 St Nicholas - Ballarat
 The Dormition Our Lady - Bell Park
 Sts Raphael, Nicholas & Irene - Bentleigh
 Holy Cross - Box Hill
 St Eleftherios - Brunswick
 St Vasilios - Brunswick
 The Resurrection of St Lazarus - Bunurong
 The Three Hierarchs - Clayton
 St Spyridon - Clayton South
 The Presentation Our Lord - Coburg
 St Panteleimon - Dandenong
 St Catherine - East Malvern
 The Annunciation of Our Lady - East Melbourne
 St Nektarios - Fawkner
 Holy Trinity - Footscray
 St Andrew - Forest Hill
 Theofania - Frankstown
 The Dormition Our Lady - Iron Bark-Bendigo
 Panagia Soumela - Keilor East
 The Annunciation Our Lady - Mildura
 St Demetrios - Moonee Ponds
 The Dormition Our Lady - Morwell
 The Presentation Our Lady to the Temple - Balwyn North
 St John The Forerunner & Baptist - Carlton North
 Sts Anargiri - Oakleigh
 Archangels - Parkdale
 St Demetrios - Prahran
 Sts Cyril & Methodius - Preston
 The Holy Trinity - Richmond
 St George - Robinvale
 St George - Shepparton
 Sts Constantine & Helen - South Yarra
 The Protection of the Virgin Mary - South Yarra (Russian-speaking)
 St Athanasios - Springvale
 St Paraskevi, St John The Merciful & St Barbara - St Albans
 St Andrew - Sunshine West
 St Anthony - Sunshine West
 St Haralambos - Templestowe
 The Transfiguration Our Lord - Thomastown
 St George - Thornbury
 Our Lady of the Myrtles - Wangaratta
 St Nicholas - Yarraville
 Holy Monastery of Panagia Gorgoepikoss - Lovely Banks
 Holy Monastery of Axion Estin - Northcote
 Holy Monastery of Panagia Kamariani - Red Hill

Queensland
 St George - South Brisbane
 St Anna - Bundall - Gold Coast
 St Stephen - Home Hill
 The Dormition of Our Lady - Innisfail
 The Dormition of Our Lady - Mount Gravatt
 St John the Forerunner & Baptist - Redlynch
 St Nektarios - Rockhampton
 Sts Paraskevi - Taigum
 St Nicholas - Toowoomba
 St Theodores - Townsville
 Greek Orthodox Parish of the Sunshine Coast - Mooloolaba

South Australia
 St Panteleimon - Glenelg North
 Sts Raphael, Nicholaos & Irene - Athelstone
 The Dormition of Our Lady - Berri
 St Demetrios - Berri North
 St Andrew - Christie Downs
 St Nicholas - Coober Pedy
 Prophet Elias - Norwood
 The Nativity of Christ - Port Adelaide
 St John - Port Augusta
 St George - Port Pirie
 St Anthony - Prospect
 Sts Constantine & Helen - Renmark
 St Demetrios - Salisbury Plain
 St George - Thebarton
 St Nicholas - Thevenard
 St Spyridon - Unley
 St Nicholas - Wallaroo
 St Constantine & Helen - Whyalla Playford
 Holy Monastery of Saint Nectarios, Croydon Park

Western Australia
 St Nektarios - Dianella
 Pantocrator - Churchlands
 St Nicholas - East Bunbury
 St Paisios - Forrestfield
 Archangels Michael & Gabriel - Geraldton
 Sts Constantine & Helen - Northbridge
 The Annunciation of Our Lady - West Perth
 Holy Monastery of St John, Forrestfield

Tasmania
 Holy Trinity - Hobart
 The Dormition of Our Lady - Launceston
 St George - South Hobart

Northern Territory
 St Nicholas - Darwin

Greek Orthodox Patriarchate of Antioch 

The Antiochian Orthodox Archdiocese of Australia is served by Metropolitan Basilios who was elected on December 16th, 2017 at the Cathedral of St. George in Redfern, Sydney.

Antiochian Churches in Australia include:

New South Wales
 St George Cathedral, Redfern
 St Nicholas, Bankstown
St John the Baptist, Croydon Park
Sts Peter and Paul, Doonside
 St Michael's Monastery, Antiochian Village, Goulburn
 St Michael, Kirrawee
 St Mary's, Mays Hill
St Mary's, Mount Pritchard
 St Nicholas, Punchbowl
 Sts Michael & Gabriel, Ryde
St Elias the Prophet, Wollongong

Victoria
 Transfiguration of Our Lord Mission, Belgrave South
 Good Shepherd Mission, Clayton
 St Ignatius, Darraweit Guim
 St Paul, Dandenong
 St Nicholas, East Melbourne
 Forty Holy Martyrs Mission, Mirboo North
 St George, Thornbury
 St Mary, Yarraville

Queensland
 St Mary Magdalene, Elimbah
St Paul, Woolloongabba

South Australia
 St. Elias, West Croydon

Russian Orthodox Church Outside of Russia 

The Russian Diocese of Australia and New Zealand is served by Metropolitan Hilarion, Archbishop of Sydney, Australia and New Zealand.

Russian Churches in Australia include:

Australian Capital Territory
 St. John the Forerunner Church – Canberra

Western Australia
 Sts. Peter and Paul Church – Bayswater

New South Wales
 Sts. Peter and Paul Diocesan Cathedral – Strathfield
 Archangel Michael Church – Blacktown
 Holy Transfiguration Monastery – Bombala
 Presentation of the Mother of God Convent – Bungarby
 Protection of the Holy Virgin Church – Cabramatta
 St. George Church – Carlton
 St. Vladimir Church – Centennial Park
 Church of All Russian Saints – Croydon
 St. Nicholas Church – Fairfield
 Our Lady of Kazan Convent – Kentlyn
 St. John the Baptist Skete – Kentlyn
 Orthodox Monastery of the Archangel Michael – Marrickville
 Sts Cyril and Methodius Community and St Xenia Church – Tweed Heads
 St. Nicholas Church – Wallsend
 St. Panteleimon Church – West Gosford
 Holy Dormition Church – Wollongong

Victoria
 Holy Virgin Protection Cathedral – East Brunswick
 Holy Fathers Community – Allansford
 Church of Icon of the Joy of All Who Sorrow – Bell Park
 Dormition of Our Lady – Dandenong
St. John of Kronstadt Chapel – Dandenong
 Holy Ascension Orthodox Mission – Williamstown

Queensland
 St. Nicholas Cathedral – Brisbane
 Holy Annunciation – Woolloongabba
 St Seraphim – Woolloongabba
 Our Lady of Vladimir – Rocklea

South Australia
 Monastery of the Prophet Elias – Monarto South
 St. Nicholas – Wayville
 St. Patrick Mission – Kilburn

Tasmania
 Exaltation of the Holy Cross – Hobart

Russian Orthodox Church (Moscow Patriarchate) 

 Protection of the Virgin Mary - Blacktown (Sydney)

 Holy Trinity - Oakleigh (Melbourne)

Russian Orthodox Church Abroad 
The Russian Diocese of Australia and New Zealand is served by Bishop Andrei, Bishop of Yarraville and Australia and New Zealand.

Russian Orthodox Church Abroad churches include:

 Monastery of St Theognios
 The Church of the Holy Martyrs Of Vilnius
 Cathedral of our Lady Of Kazan
 The Church of Holy Archangel Michael
 The Church of the Iveron Icon of the Mother Of God
 The Church of the Vladimir Icon of the Mother Of God

Romanian Orthodox Church 

Romanian Orthodox Episcopate of Australia and New Zealand is served by bishop Mihail Filimon who entheroned on April 20, 2008, at the Patriarchal Cathedral in Bucharest.

Romanian Churches in Australia include:

 Holy Apostles Peter and Paul - Melbourne
 St. Mary's Parish - Sydney
St. John the Baptist Parish - Sydney
St. Gregory the Theologian Parish - Sydney
 Holy Brancoveni Martyrs Parish - Sydney
 Saint Nicholas Parish - Adelaide
 Saint Dumitru Parish - Brisbane
 St. Philip the Apostle Parish - Brisbane
 Holy Trinity Parish - Perth
 St. Thomas the Apostle Parish - Dandenong
 St. Andrew the Apostle Parish - Newcastle
 St. Spiridon Parish - Cairns
 St. Philotheus of Arges Parish - Bayswater
 Parish of the Three Holy Hierarchs - Canberra

Bulgarian Orthodox Church 

Bulgarian Eastern Orthodox Diocese of the USA, Canada, and Australia is served by Metropolitan Joseph.

Bulgarian Churches in Australia include:

 Sts Cyril & Methodius Bulgarian Eastern Orthodox Cathedral - Melbourne
 St Petka Bulgarian Eastern Orthodox Church - Adelaide

Serbian Orthodox Church 

The Serbian Orthodox Eparchy of Australia and New Zealand is served by bishop Siluan Mrakić who was elected on August 7th, 2016 at St. Michael's Cathedral in Belgrade.

Serbian Churches in Australia include:

Australian Capital Territory
 St Sava Serbian Orthodox Church, Canberra
 St George Free Serbian Orthodox Parish, Canberra

New South Wales
 St Lazarus Serbian Orthodox Cathedral, Sydney
 St Sava Serbian Orthodox Pro-Cathedral, Ingleside
 St Nicholas Serbian Orthodox Church, Blacktown
 St George Serbian Orthodox Church, Cabramatta
 St Michael The Archangel Free Serbian Orthodox Church, Homebush
 St Sava Serbian Orthodox Church, Homebush West
 St Naum of Ohrid Serbian Orthodox Church, Newcastle
 St Stephen The Archdeacon Free Serbian Orthodox Church, Rooty Hill
 St John The Baptist Serbian Orthodox Church, Wollongong
 St John The Baptist, Wollongong
 Synaxis of the Serbian Saints, Central Coast
 St George Serbian Orthodox Church, Lightning Ridge
 St Luke the Apostle Serbian Orthodox Church, Liverpool
 Sts Simeon and Ana Serbian Orthodox Parish, Moree (under planning)

Victoria
 Holy Trinity Serbian Orthodox Cathedral, Melbourne
 St Steven of Dechani  Serbian Orthodox Parish, Carrum Downs
 St Nicholas Serbian Orthodox Church, Geelong
 St Sava Free Serbian Orthodox Church, Greensborough
 St Stephen the Archdeacon Serbian Orthodox Church, Keysborough
 St Petka Serbian Orthodox Church, Rockbank
 St George Serbian Orthodox Church, St Albans
 Sts Peter And Paul Serbian Orthodox Church, Wodonga
 Holy Trinity Serbian Orthodox Church, Yallourn North
 St Ignatius of Antioch and St Aidan Of Lindisfarne Orthodox Church, Ballarat
 St Basil of Ostrog Serbian Orthodox Church, Langwarrin

Queensland
 St Nicholas Serbian Orthodox Church, Brisbane – Wacol
 St Nicholas Serbian Orthodox Church, Brisbane – Woolloongabba
 Dormition of the Most Holy Theotokos, Gold Coast
 St Nicholas Serbian Orthodox Parish, South Brisbane
 St Elijah the Prophet Serbian Orthodox Parish, Cairns

South Australia
 St Sava Serbian Orthodox Parish, Adelaide – Hindmarsh
 St Sava Serbian Orthodox Church, Adelaide – Woodville Park
 St Elijah the Prophet Serbian Orthodox Church - Coober Pedy

Western Australia
 Holy Trinity Serbian Orthodox Church, Perth
 St Sava Serbian Orthodox Church, Perth
St Basil of Ostrog Serbian Orthodox Parish, North Perth
 St Basil of Ostrog Serbian Orthodox Parish, Rockingham

Tasmania
 Holy Cross Serbian Orthodox Parish, Hobart

Northern Territory
 St Sava Serbian Orthodox Church, Darwin

Macedonian Orthodox Church

Diocese of Australia and New Zealand 
In 1995, Metropolitan Peter was asked, as a competent Bishop, by the Holy Synod of MOC to take the management of Australian and New Zealand Diocese. Later he became the Archbishop of Diocese of Australia and New Zealand.

Macedonian Churches in Australia include:

Victoria
 Nativity of the Virgin Mary Mother of God – Cathedral Church, Sydenham
Saint Nicholas – Preston
Saint Prophet Elias – Footscray
 Saint Parasceva – Mill Park
 Saint Demetrius of Solun – Springvale
 Saint Zlata of Meglen – Werribee

New South Wales
 Holy Mother of God – Liverpool
 Holy Trinity – Sutherland
 Saint Basil the Great – Newcastle
 Saint Clement of Ohrid – Port Kembla

Western Australia
 Saint Nicholas – Perth

South Australia
 Sinanaxis of the Most Holy Mother of God – Adelaide

Queensland
 Dormition of the Most Holy Mother of God – Brisbane

Diocese of Australia and Sydney 
Macedonian Diocese of Australia and Sydney is served by Metropolitan Timotej.

Macedonian Churches in Australia include:

Victoria

 Church of the Assumption of the Blessed Virgin Mary - Sydenham, Melbourne
 Church of St. George and the Blessed Virgin - Epping, Melbourne
 St. Clement of Ohrid Monastery - King Lake, Melbourne
 St. John the Baptist Church - Geelong

New South Wales

 St Nicholas Church - Cabramata, Sydney
 St. Demetrios Church - Wollongong, Sydney
 St. Petka Church - Rockdale, Sydney
 St. Elias Church - Queanbeyan

Australian Capital Territory

 St. Clement of Ohrid Church - Canberra

Western Australia

 St. Nicholas Church - Perth

South Australia

 St. Naum of Ohrid Church - Adelaide

Queensland

 Holy Sunday Church - Gold Coast

Ukrainian Orthodox Church

Ukrainian Orthodox Church in Diaspora 
Ukrainian Diocese of Australia and New Zealand (Ecumenical Patriarchate) is served by bishop Metropolitan Anthony.  On 6 October 1985, he was consecrated as Bishop at St. Andrew Memorial Church at the Ukrainian Orthodox Church's Metropolia Center in South Bound Brook, NJ. Bishop Antony was asked and agreed to fill a void in the life of the Ukrainian Orthodox Eparchy of Australia and New Zealand in 1989 and served as Bishop there in addition to his responsibilities to his Church in the USA.

Ukrainian Orthodox Churches in Australia include:

 Parish of St. Nicholas the Wonderworker - Canberra
 Parish of the Intercession of the Blessed Virgin - New South Wales
 St Aphanasius, Granville - New South Wales
 Parish of Intercession of The Holy Virgin - Victoria
 Parish of the Assumption of the Blessed Virgin - Victoria
 Parish of the Nativity of the Blessed Virgin - Victoria
 Parish of St. Nicholas the Wonderworker - Western Australia
 Parish of St. Nicholas the Wonderworker - Queensland
 Church of Sts Peter and Paul - South Australia

Autocephalous Greek Orthodox Church of America and Australia

Greek Orthodox Community of South Australia Inc. 

 Greek Orthodox Cathedral of the Archangels Michael & Gabriel, Adelaide SA
 Greek Orthodox Church of the Dormition of the Theotokos, Croydon SA
 Greek Orthodox Church of Sts Constantine & Helen, Goodwood SA
 Greek Orthodox Chapel of Sts Cosmas & Damianos, Ridleyton SA
 Greek Orthodox Church of St Nicholas, Thebarton SA
 Greek Orthodox Chapel of the Holy Virgin, Two Wells SA

Greek Orthodox Community of Newcastle Inc. 

 Greek Orthodox Church of St Demetrios, Hamilton East (Newcastle) NSW

Greek Orthodox Community of St Albans Vic. 
Greek Orthodox Church of St Paraskevi, St Albans (Melbourne) VIC

True Orthodox Church in Australia 
True Greek (Genuine) Orthodox Church in Australia comprises the Genuine Greek Orthodox Church.

Churches include:</ref>

Greek Orthodox (Old Calendar) 
 The All-Holy Quick-Hearer - Carnegie, VIC
 Holy Apostles Peter & Paul - Greek Orthodox Church
 St Gregory the Theologian - Greek Orthodox Church
 Dormition of the Theotokos - Greek Orthodox Church
 Sts Anargyroi - Dulwich Hill, NSW - Greek Orthodox Church
 Annunciation of the Virgin Mary and St Marina - Dublin, SA
 Dormition of the Virgin Mary - Bexley, NSW
 Protection of the Virgin Mary - Merrylands, NSW
 All Saints - Kaleen, ACT
 Holy Cross Orthodox Mission - Melbourne, VIC

See also 
 Christianity in Australia
Orthodox Church in America Parishes in Australia
List of monasteries in Australia
List of cathedrals in Australia
 List of Coptic Orthodox churches in Australia
 List of Catholic dioceses in Australia
List of Catholic churches in Australia
 Catholic Church in Australia
:Category:Protestantism in Australia by state or territory
List of Anglican churches in the Diocese of Sydney
List of Presbyterian and Reformed denominations in Australia
:Category:Christian denominations in Australia
Eastern Orthodoxy by country

External links 
 Orthodoxy in Australia (Orthodox wiki)
Statistics of Orthodoxy in Australia
All Greek Churches in Australia (Google map)
List of Eastern Orthodox monasteries in Australia
Orthodoxy in Australia
Australia's Christian Heritage (Orthodox)
Eastern and Oriental Orthodox Churches in Australia

References 

Eastern Orthodox Church
Eastern Orthodoxy in Australia
Eastern Orthodox dioceses in Oceania